The 1978 RTHK Top 10 Gold Songs Awards was held in 1978 for the 1977 music season.

Top 10 song awards
The top 10 songs (十大中文金曲) of 1978 are as follows.

References
 RTHK top 10 gold song awards 1978

RTHK Top 10 Gold Songs Awards
Rthk Top 10 Gold Songs Awards, 1978
Rthk Top 10 Gold Songs Awards, 1978